Weeton railway station serves the villages of Weeton and Huby in North Yorkshire, England.

History
The Leeds and Thirsk Railway was authorised in 1845, and built in stages. On 9 July 1849, the final section of the original L&TR main line was formally opened, between Weeton and Leeds. The station at Weeton was described as Weeton for Ormscliff Crags in some timetables.

Facilities

The station is unstaffed, but has ticket machines in place to allow intending passengers to buy prior to boarding the train.  There are only basic shelters on each platform, but there are passenger information screens in place and a public address system to provide train running information.  Neither platform is DDA-compliant, as the Leeds one has steps to it and access to the Harrogate one is via a steep pathway.

Services

During Monday to Saturday daytimes, there is generally a half-hourly service southbound to Leeds and a half-hourly service northbound to Knaresborough with one train per hour onwards to York.

In the evenings and on Sundays there is generally an hourly service in each direction, with some services starting/terminating at Harrogate at the beginning & end of service.

References

External links

Railway stations in North Yorkshire
DfT Category F2 stations
Former North Eastern Railway (UK) stations
Railway stations in Great Britain opened in 1848
Northern franchise railway stations